The May 2014 Buni Yadi attack was a terrorist attack that occurred on 27 May 2014 in the town of Buni Yadi, Yobe State, Nigeria. Some 49 security personnel (soldiers and police) and 9 civilians were killed.

The attack was blamed on Boko Haram.

Background 
The Boko Haram insurgency is an insurgency perpetrated by the Boko Haram group. It began in 2009 against the government of Nigeria, but expanded to attacking other states. Ideologically, they are Islamic fundamentalists.

Attack
Before the attack, a large number of insurgents gathered outside the town in disguised Hiluxes, armed with IEDs and rocket launchers. At approximately 8:00 UTC, terrorists assaulted a military checkpoint, firing on the soldiers there. Then, they set fire to a local police station and killed police, including the Divisional Police Officer. Several other government buildings along with the house of a local government leader were also torched. The combatants moved to fire on an empty primary school. According to a witness, the insurgents targeted security forces, rather than civilians. Civilian deaths were seemingly unintentional. The attack ended at around 9:00 UTC.

References

2014 murders in Nigeria
Massacres perpetrated by Boko Haram
Terrorist incidents in Nigeria in 2014
Mass murder in 2014
May 2014 events in Africa